AGI or Agi may refer to:

Organisations
 African Gender Institute, gender studies institute based in South Africa
 Alan Guttmacher Institute, now simply the Guttmacher Institute
 Alliance Graphique Internationale, a group of graphic artists and designers
 American Gamelan Institute
 American Geosciences Institute, formerly the American Geological Institute
  (Association of Italian Guides), a former Catholic Girl Scouting association

Companies
 Agenzia Giornalistica Italia, an Italian news agency
 Alliance Global Group, Inc., a large holding company in the Philippines
 American Graphics Institute, an American publisher
 Analytical Graphics, Inc., an American provider of space and national defense software Systems Tool Kit

Places
 Agi, Iran, a village in East Azerbaijan Province, Iran
 Agi River, a river in Gifu Prefecture, Japan
 Agi Station, a train station in Nakatsugawa, Gifu Prefecture, Japan
 Wageningen Airstrip (IATA code)

Science and technology
 Adventure Game Interpreter, an adventure game engine used by Sierra On-Line
 Alpha-glucosidase inhibitor, anti-diabetic drugs
 Artificial general intelligence, an artificial intelligence paradigm
 Conference on Artificial General Intelligence, or AGI, an annual conference on the subject
 Asterisk Gateway Interface, a software interface and communications protocol
 Silver iodide (formula AgI), an inorganic compound

People
 Alejandro González Iñárritu (born 1963), Mexican film director
 Agi, musician Long Kuan, former member of Mika Bomb
 Agi, pseudonym for Magdalena Agnes Lamm

Given name
 Ági Donáth (1918–2008), Hungarian-American actress
 Agi Jambor (1909–1997), Hungarian pianist
 Agi Kassoumi (born 1966), Greek pistol shooter
 Agi Lindegren (1858–1927), Swedish architect and illustrator
 Ági Mészáros (1918–1989), Hungarian film actress
 Agi Mishol (Hebrew: , born 1947) Israeli poet
 Agi Murad (late 1790s–1852), Avar resistance leader
 Ági Szalóki (born 1978), Hungarian folk singer

Surname
 Anna Pak Agi (1782–1839), Korean Christian martyr
 Sam Agi, ruler of Temasek (ancient Singapore)
 Tadashi Agi (born 1962), Japanese manga artist

Other uses
 Adjusted gross income
 Advanced Ground Instructor, a class of Ground Instructor certificate issued in the United States by the Federal Aviation Administration
 Akademisches Gymnasium Innsbruck, a school in Innsbruck, Austria
 Agariya language (ISO-639: agi), a Munda language of India
 Agi language, a Torricelli language of Papua New Guinea
 Agî, a Hiligaynon word for effeminate men
 Australian Geographical Indication, registered regions for wine labelling
 Auxiliary General Intelligence, a spy ship